Abdellatif Abdelhamid (born January 5, 1954) is a Syrian film director. His films have earned numerous awards, beginning with the Damascus International Film Festival, the Carthage Film Festival, and Rabat International Film Festival.

He studied at the Gerasimov Institute of Cinematography in Moscow.

Filmography
 Umniyat (Wishes, 1983) (Documentary).
 Aydina (Our Hands, 1982) (Documentary).
 Layali Ibn Awa, (Nights of the Jackals, 1989).
 Rasael Shafahiyyah (Verbal Letters, 1991).
 Suoud al-Matar (The Rise of Rain, 1994).
 Nassim al-Roh (Soul Breeze, 1998).
 Qamaran wa Zaytouna (Two Moons and an Olive, 2001).
 Ma Yatlubuhu al-Musstamiun (At Our Listeners’ Request, 2003).
 Kharej al-Taghtiya (Out of Coverage, 2007).
 September's Rain(2011)

References

External links

Living people
Syrian documentary filmmakers
People from Homs
1954 births
Syrian film directors
Syrian Alawites